The 8th parallel north is a circle of latitude that is 8 degrees north of the Earth's equatorial plane. It crosses Africa, the Indian Ocean, South Asia, Southeast Asia, the Pacific Ocean, Central America, South America and the Atlantic Ocean.

The parallel defines part of the border between Somalia and Ethiopia.  The Eight Degree Channel (Maliku Kandu) in the Indian Ocean is named after the parallel.

Around the world
Starting at the Prime Meridian and heading eastwards, the parallel 8° north passes through:

{| class="wikitable plainrowheaders"
! scope="col" | Co-ordinates
! scope="col" | Country, territory or sea
! scope="col" | Notes
|-
| 
! scope="row" | 
| Passing through Lake Volta
|-
| 
! scope="row" | 
|
|-
| 
! scope="row" | 
|
|-
| 
! scope="row" | 
|
|-
| 
! scope="row" | 
|
|-
| 
! scope="row" | 
|
|-
| 
! scope="row" | 
|
|-
| 
! scope="row" | 
| 
|-
| 
! scope="row" | 
|
|-
| 
! scope="row" |  /  border
|
|-
| 
! scope="row" | 
|
|-valign="top"
| style="background:#b0e0e6;" | 
! scope="row" style="background:#b0e0e6;" | Indian Ocean
| style="background:#b0e0e6;" | Passing through the Arabian Sea Into the Eight Degree Channel - passing just south of Minicoy Island,  And into the Laccadive Sea - passing just south of Kanyakumari(Cape Comorin), 
|-
| 
! scope="row" | 
|
|-
| style="background:#b0e0e6;" | 
! scope="row" style="background:#b0e0e6;" | Indian Ocean
| style="background:#b0e0e6;" | Bay of Bengal
|-
| 
! scope="row" | 
| Andaman and Nicobar Islands - islands of Katchal, Camorta and Nancowry
|-
| style="background:#b0e0e6;" | 
! scope="row" style="background:#b0e0e6;" | Indian Ocean
| style="background:#b0e0e6;" | Andaman Sea
|-
| 
! scope="row" | 
| Island of Phuket
|-
| style="background:#b0e0e6;" | 
! scope="row" style="background:#b0e0e6;" | Phang Nga Bay
| style="background:#b0e0e6;" |
|-
| 
! scope="row" | 
| Island of Ko Yao Yai
|-
| style="background:#b0e0e6;" | 
! scope="row" style="background:#b0e0e6;" | Phang Nga Bay
| style="background:#b0e0e6;" |
|-
| 
! scope="row" | 
| Krabi and Nakhon Si Thammarat provinces
|-
| style="background:#b0e0e6;" | 
! scope="row" style="background:#b0e0e6;" | Gulf of Thailand
| style="background:#b0e0e6;" |
|-
| style="background:#b0e0e6;" | 
! scope="row" style="background:#b0e0e6;" | South China Sea
| style="background:#b0e0e6;" |
|-
| 
! scope="row" | 
| Balabac Island
|-
| style="background:#b0e0e6;" | 
! scope="row" style="background:#b0e0e6;" | Sulu Sea
| style="background:#b0e0e6;" |
|-
| 
! scope="row" | 
| Island of Mindanao
|-valign="top"
| style="background:#b0e0e6;" | 
! scope="row" style="background:#b0e0e6;" | Pacific Ocean
| style="background:#b0e0e6;" | Passing just south of Kayangel atoll,  Passing just south of Pikelot island, 
|-
| 
! scope="row" | 
| Namu Atoll
|-valign="top"
| style="background:#b0e0e6;" | 
! scope="row" style="background:#b0e0e6;" | Pacific Ocean
| style="background:#b0e0e6;" | Passing just south of Aur Atoll,  Passing just south of Burica Point,  Passing just north of Islas Secas, 
|-
| 
! scope="row" | 
|
|-
| style="background:#b0e0e6;" | 
! scope="row" style="background:#b0e0e6;" | Pacific Ocean
| style="background:#b0e0e6;" | Gulf of Panama
|-
| 
! scope="row" | 
|
|-
| 
! scope="row" | 
| Passing through the Gulf of Urabá
|-
| 
! scope="row" | 
|
|-
| 
! scope="row" | Disputed area
|-
| style="background:#b0e0e6;" | 
! scope="row" style="background:#b0e0e6;" | Atlantic Ocean
| style="background:#b0e0e6;" |
|-
| 
! scope="row" | 
|
|-
| 
! scope="row" | 
|
|-
| 
! scope="row" | 
|
|-
| 
! scope="row" | 
|
|-
| 
! scope="row" | 
| Passing through Lake Volta
|-
|}

See also
7th parallel north
9th parallel north

n08
Ethiopia–Somalia border